Theft by finding occurs when someone chances upon an object which seems abandoned and takes possession of the object, but fails to take steps to establish whether the object is genuinely abandoned and not merely lost or unattended before taking it for themselves. In some jurisdictions, the crime is called "larceny by finding" or "stealing by finding".

By nation

United States 

In the United States, if the owner of a property has renounced all property rights in the object, then the property is abandoned. Since theft is the unlawful taking of another person's property, an essential element of the actus reus of theft is absent.

The finder of lost property acquires a possessory right by taking physical control of the property, but does not necessarily have ownership of the property. The finder must take reasonable steps to locate the owner. If the finder shows that reasonable steps to find the owner have been taken then the finder may establish that the required mens rea for theft, the intention to deprive the owner permanently, is absent.

An issue may arise when a person takes possession of lost property with the intention of returning it to the owner after inquiry but later converts the property to the finder's use. This is illustrated by Thompson v. Nixon [1965] 3 W.L.R. 501: an off duty police constable found a bag of rabbit food lying by the roadside, took it home intending to hand it in as lost property but some time after decided to keep it for his own use. He was found guilty at first instance but his ultimate appeal to the Divisional Court was upheld. The appellate court held that, at the time of finding, there was no mens rea to support a conviction of larceny.

Trash
In California v. Greenwood (1988), the United States Supreme Court ruled that trash left at curbside for collection is effectively abandoned and subject to taking by anyone. This ruling superseded the California Supreme Court ruling, in People v. Krivda (1971), that placing trash at curbside was not necessarily an abandonment of same to the police or general public, as a reasonable assumption would be that only a particular regulated entity (i.e. the trash collection company or department) would take possession. 

Thus garbology (the examination and analysis of trash) and dumpster diving are legal in the United States. Consequently, the abandonment of private medical records by placing them in trash has resulted in civil penalties against companies doing so.

Australia 
In Victoria, the Victorian Crimes Act defines this crime by exception "72.3(c) A person's appropriation of property belonging to another is not to be regarded as dishonest if he appropriates the property in the belief that the person to whom the property belongs cannot be discovered by taking reasonable steps.

In Queensland, there is a similar warning.

References 

Theft